The 1985 UEFA Cup Final was a football tie played on 8 May and 22 May 1985 between Real Madrid of Spain and Videoton of Hungary. Real Madrid won 3–1 on aggregate. Real would later make this a cup-double, by winning the Copa de la Liga on 15 June after another two-legged final, against their cross-town rivals Atlético Madrid.

Real Madrid's win was the club's first European silverware in nearly two decades (their last major European honour had been the 1965–66 European Cup).

Route to the final

En route to the final, Real Madrid knocked out the holders, Tottenham Hotspur, in the quarter-finals, defeating the London-based club by a score of 1–0 on aggregate. The lone goal of the tie was an own goal from Tottenham's Steve Perryman during the first leg.

Source:

Match details

First leg

Second leg

Source:

See also
1984–85 UEFA Cup
Fehérvár FC in European football
Real Madrid CF in international football competitions

References

2
UEFA Cup Final 1985
UEFA Cup Final 1985
UEFA Cup Finals
International club association football competitions hosted by Spain
International club association football competitions hosted by Hungary
Uefa
UEFA
May 1985 sports events in Europe
1980s in Madrid
Sports competitions in Madrid